Jin'anqiao station is an interchange station on Line 6, Line 11 and  of the Beijing Subway.

The Line 6 station was opened on December 30, 2018. The Line 11 station opened on December 31, 2021, and currently serves as the northern terminus of the line until the opening of Moshikou.

The Line 6 station and the Line 11 station are underground. The Line S1 station is elevated.

Station Layout 
The line 6 station has an underground island platform. The line 11 station has an underground island platform. The Line S1 station has 2 elevated side platforms.

Exits 
There are 9 exits, lettered A, B, C, D, E, F, H, J and K. Exits A, B, C, F, H and J are accessible.

Gallery

References 

Beijing Subway stations in Shijingshan District
Railway stations in China opened in 2017